Snoqualmie might refer to:

People
 Snoqualmie people, a Coast Salish people of Washington state
Snoqualmie Indian Tribe, a federally recognized tribe of Snoqualmie people

Places
 Snoqualmie Indian Reservation
Snoqualmie Valley, ancestral home to the Snoqualmie tribe
 Snoqualmie, Washington, a city in King County, Washington
 The Snoqualmie River
 Snoqualmie Falls, a large waterfall on the Snoqualmie River
 Snoqualmie Pass, a mountain pass over the Cascade Range
 Snoqualmie Pass, Washington, a census designated place (CDP) in Kittitas County, Washington
 Snoqualmie Mountain, a mountain near Snoqualmie Pass
 Mount Baker–Snoqualmie National Forest

Other
 Snoqualmie Valley School District, a public school district serving the city of Snoqualmie and surrounding areas
Snoqualmie Depot, a rail depot in Snoqualmie owned by the Northwest Railway Museum
 The Summit at Snoqualmie, a winter resort located at Snoqualmie Pass, Washington
 Snoqualmie, a wine label produced by the Ste. Michelle Wine Estates division of Altria
 , Seattle's first fireboat